Billy Joe Ledesma Crawford (born May 16, 1982) is a Filipino actor, musician, singer, dancer, comedian and television host who released 7 studio albums and has had a number of singles, notably "Trackin'", "When You Think About Me" (a remake of a One Voice hit) and "You Didn't Expect That" amongst others. In 2019, he released the single "Filipina Girl" and the album Work in Progress on Viva Records.

He has hosted a number of talent shows of ABS-CBN including Pinoy Dream Academy, Pilipinas Got Talent, Your Face Sounds Familiar, Pinoy Boyband Superstar, Your Face Sounds Familiar Kids, Little Big Shots and Idol Philippines and became a judge in World of Dance Philippines and Your Moment.

Early life and career
Billy Joe Ledesma Crawford was born in Manila, Philippines, to a Filipino mother from Jaro, Iloilo City named Mayette Ledesma and an American father named Jack Crawford. He has two half-brothers.

Crawford was discovered at the early age of 3 years, singing at a bowling alley that his mother often visited. He became a series regular on an afternoon GMA Network television show called That's Entertainment under the name Billy Joe. Afterwards, he acted in various screen works such as the films Lost Command and Sandakot Na Bala and the anthology drama series Lovingly Yours, Helen, with his performances being consistently acclaimed. For his performance in the latter's episode "My Brother, My Friend" in 1988, Meg Mendoza of the Manila Standard stated that Crawford was "the most natural child actor we've seen after Jay Ilagan", though she noted that his Tagalog can be improved upon.

He attended the Imus Unida Christian School in the Philippines until his departure for the US when he was 12 and balanced both his professional acting and his studies. In the United States, he started a music career, performing mostly in the United Kingdom and France, as well as in Asia. His early career started in Dallas, Texas, where he lived and performed his singing and then moved to New York City. During this time, he legally changed his stage name to Billy Crawford. He first went to P.S./I.S. 217 Roosevelt Island Public School and then to Professional Performing Arts School in New York City with other famous professional children, such as Lee Thompson Young, Mandy Moore and Nina Sky.

In 1995, when he was 13, he landed his first professional gig as a backup dancer for Michael Jackson for his performance of Dangerous at the 1995 MTV Video Music Awards.

Albums

Billy Crawford (1997–1999)
Crawford recorded his self-titled first album Billy Crawford (which included hits such as "Urgently in Love" and "Mary Lopez") when he was 15 years old.

Ride (2001–2002)

In 2001, "Trackin'" was the first single from the album Ride and can be deemed as the singer's most successful hit single: it peaked at number five for five weeks in France and was certified platinum. As of August 2014, it was the 74th best-selling single of the 21st century in France, with 343,000 units sold. The song reached No. 1 in the Netherlands, No. 2 in Belgium, No. 3 in Switzerland and No. 20 in Germany. In the UK, the song was released as the third single after "You Didn't Expect That" in August 2003 and reached No. 32 on the UK chart.

By April 2002, Crawford was back on the scene with his second album, Ride. This was certified gold in France (selling 100,000 copies) within just a few weeks and gold in Switzerland. The album went on to achieve platinum status in the French market (selling 300,000 copies) and a total of 600,000 copies has been sold to date. As for singles, following the success of the second track, "When You Think About Me" (over 250,000 copies sold in France), Crawford returned in September 2002 with a third single from the Ride album, "You Didn't Expect That", which went directly into the top 5 and was certified gold in December, having sold more than 250,000 copies in just a few weeks. After this grand success, he returned in 2003 with two versions of a previously unreleased track: the English version of "Someone Like You" and a special Franco-English version for France, "Me passer de toi", which stayed in the singles charts for some weeks.

Big City (2004–2005)

The album Big City was produced by some of the best producers in the American music industry such as Kovas (Ghettobeat Production), J Que (from "The Clutch"), Tricky Stewart and Laney Stewart (RedZone Entertainment), The CornaBoyz, Pale Face, Desmond Child and Stargate. He left his old company, V2 records, wanting to expand his career into something bigger.

Big City Tour Live (2005)
Big City Tour Live is the live release DVD album from Crawford. The DVD was released in France in 2005. It was directed by Michel Jankielewicz, produced by Yves El-Baze and distributed by UMG (2005) (worldwide) (DVD). The budget of this album was €150,000 (estimated).

It's Time (2007)
It's Time is the fourth studio album by Crawford. It was released in 2007 with its first single, "Like That".

Groove (2009)
Groove is the fifth studio album by Crawford. It contains re-workings of classic hits from the 1970s and 1980s.

Sky Is the Limit (2013)
Sky Is the Limit is the first EP (and sixth release) by Crawford. It features five new tracks as well as one remix and one instrumental. It was released through the independent label, Jackpot Records.

Work in Progress (2019)
In 2019, Crawford released the single "Filipina Girl" as the carrier single from the album Work in Progress. It consists of ten tracks with a bonus track featuring Marcus Davis Jr. who produced the album. He once said that the album is dedicated to his wife Coleen García who motivated him to go back to music. Work in Progress was released March 22, 2019 under Viva Records.

Music and television career
Crawford had major chart success in France and other parts of Europe but did not repeat this success in the United Kingdom and the United States, although his single "You Didn't Expect That" did make the lower reaches of the UK Top 40, peaking at number 35. He also contributed a cover of the original Pokémon TV series theme song for Pokémon: The First Movie. In 2002, Crawford also appeared at a popular Filipino-American event called "Fiesta Filipina", held in San Francisco, California.

Crawford's album Big City was released in 2004 in France and Asia only. The single "Bright Lights" was unable to break into any Top 10 charts. The second single "Steamy Nights", produced by Kovas – Ghetto Beat, fared better, making the Top 40, and was featured on 7 compilations across Europe and was the first single in Germany. Crawford's music video for "Steamy Nights" was shot in Los Angeles, California, and was produced with the same people who worked on the Destiny's Child single "Lose My Breath". Actress Jenna Dewan, who was one of the main characters in the popular 2006 film Step Up, was featured as Crawford's dance partner.

Another song from the album, "Candy Store", was leaked from the album and received airplay on London radio. Thought to be a duet with Ginuwine, it is featured on the Big City album. After doing the first-ever online reality show The MSN Dance Show, his third single from the album, "3 Wishes", was canceled by his label. Crawford felt that it was time for something new and decided not to re-sign his contract with V2 Records. The same year, he voiced Dean in the 1st episode from the 3rd season of the animated TV show Totally Spies!.

In 2006, Crawford began recording a new album which was expected to be released in 2007. In 2006, he toured during the summer with the group L5 in France and in November he was scheduled to return to his home country to shoot a film. That same year, he was recorded a cover of Super Freak by Rick James from the French animated film Asterix and the Vikings.

In 2007, he returned to the Philippines for a new dance reality show, MOVE: The Search for Billy Crawford's Pinoy Dancers, for GMA Network. The show searched for six back-up dancers to be called The Movers, for his very first Philippine concert, 'Billy Crawford: It's Time', held at the Araneta Coliseum. He brought along with him the brainchild of MOVE, the then-wife and official dance choreographer Marie Courchinoux, known as 'Maryss from Paris', to be one of the main judges of the show as the Move Master. Initially having six Movers as his back-up crew, he eventually added a seventh Mover to complete the crew. Crawford's official dancers were Darcy Godoy, JM Vergara, Aizel Moñeva, AJ Sarate, Jobel Dayrit, Daniel Agbisit and Mich Garong. After the successful concert, he returned to the United States to work on projects and fulfill several commitments.

In 2008, upon his return to the Philippines, Crawford signed with ABS-CBN as an exclusive artist after 23 years of GMA. He became a regular on the Sunday variety show ASAP and later hosted Pinoy Dream Academy Überture, a reality search that involves the skill of singing.

In 2009, he returned to acting via Your Song Presents with his partner and fellow singer Nikki Gil. He also released his fifth studio album Groove in the Philippines as well as worldwide digital services later that year. He also hosted a former talent show, Showtime.

In 2010, he hosted Pilipinas Got Talent with fellow co-host Luis Manzano. Both of them won as Best Talent Search Program Hosts at the 24th PMPC Star Awards for TV.

From 2011 to 2020, Crawford hosted with Vhong Navarro and other hosts in the weekday variety show It's Showtime.

In 2013, he released his first EP, Sky Is the Limit, on the independent label Jackpot Records. This was his first music release since 2009. On April 4, 2014, he renewed his contract with Universal Records. He was set to release a new album later that year. In 2017, when he was promoting a Soul Brothers concert which includes him, he performed his new single Future for his wife Coleen García.

In September 2020, he temporarily transferred to TV5 Network to host the Philippine version of The Masked Singer and the noontime variety show Lunch Out Loud. Later, he would also host The Wall Philippines.

In 2022, he participated in the French television dance competition "Danse avec les stars" and won the competition with his partner, Fauve Hautot.

Legal issues
In September 2014, Crawford was involved in an incident at a Bonifacio Global City police precinct where he allegedly flew into a drunken rage, injuring a desk officer and damaging the precinct's glass door in the ensuing scuffle.

Crawford, who had no prior history of legal incidents, has since issued an apology to his fans and to the officers whom he crossed paths with, though mischief and assault charges have been filed against him.

Personal life
After moving to the United States at age 12, Crawford lived in Dallas and then New York City and has also lived in Paris and spent one year residing in London. He also lived in Los Angeles in 2007. He is multilingual; with his first language being Tagalog, his second being English and third, French.

After Crawford returned to the Philippines, he dated singer-actress Nikki Gil. In 2013, Crawford and Gil broke up. The next year, he began dating his co-host Coleen García from It's Showtime!. The two became engaged on December 20, 2016, and married on April 20, 2018. On September 10, 2020, they welcomed their son, Amari.

Discography

Albums

EPs

Singles

Notes

 A^ Song was released in the United States in 2001, and internationally in 2003.
 B^ Song was originally recorded by the Filipino-American girl group One Voice.
 C^ Album and songs were released only in the Philippines, and therefore, did not chart as there are no official albums and singles charts in the Philippines.

Filmography

In 2007, Crawford received an offer to do a dance film called Back Down. He was also supposed to read for a film with Whoopi Goldberg, but these Hollywood productions were pushed back. Crawford's life story has also been shown on the Philippine television drama show Maalaala Mo Kaya.

Awards and nominations

References

External links
  
 

1982 births
Living people
ABS-CBN personalities
American male actors of Filipino descent
American musicians of Filipino descent
Converts to evangelical Christianity from Roman Catholicism
Filipino contemporary R&B singers
Filipino emigrants to the United States
Filipino evangelicals
Filipino male child actors
Filipino male comedians
Filipino people of American descent
Filipino television variety show hosts
Filipino male voice actors
GMA Network personalities
Hiligaynon people
Male actors from Metro Manila
Singers from Metro Manila
Sony Music Publishing artists
Tagalog people
That's Entertainment Tuesday Group Members
TV5 (Philippine TV network) personalities
Universal Records (Philippines) artists
Viva Artists Agency
Your Face Sounds Familiar (Philippine TV series)
Danse avec les stars winners
21st-century Filipino male singers
21st-century American male singers
21st-century American singers